André Gruchet (17 April 1933 – 3 May 2015) was a French track cyclist who won a bronze medal in the sprint at the 1959 World Championships. He also competed in the tandem event at the 1956 Summer Olympics and the sprint event at the 1960 Summer Olympics.

References

External links
 

1933 births
2015 deaths
French male cyclists
Olympic cyclists of France
Cyclists at the 1956 Summer Olympics
Cyclists at the 1960 Summer Olympics
Sportspeople from Épinay-sur-Seine
Cyclists from Île-de-France